Atibadi Jagannatha Dasa was an Odia poet and litterateur. He was one of  the 5 great poets in Odia literature, the Panchasakha. He wrote the Odia Bhagabata.

Early life 
Dasa was born in Kapileswarpur Sasana (one of the 16 traditional Sasana villages in Puri) on Radhastami in 1491, in an established Brahmin family of Kaushiki Gotra. His mother was Padmabati Debi and his father was Bhagabana Dasa.

His father was a speaker of the Bhagavata in Utkala. Pleased with Bhagbana Dasa's elucidation of the Bhagavata, King Purushottama Deva, the then reigning king of Utkala, gave him the title “Purana Panda”. He trained Jagannatha to follow him as a Purana Panda. Jagannatha Dasa was almost the same age as Chaitanya. Soon after their chance meeting under the Kalpa Bata, a spiritual kinship grew between the two that developed into a warm, lifelong friendship. Chaitanya was an avid admirer of Dasa and called him "Atibadi."

Literary works 
Dasa wrote the Odia Bhagabata. It had a great influence in the standardizing of the Odia language. Its popularity in Odisha reached to the level of it being worshiped in many homes in Odisha. The villages in Odisha used to have a small house or room known as bhagabata tungi, where villagers would gather to listen to recitations of Dasa's Bhagabata. Many of its verses have become proverbs and are cited by people throughout Odisha.

The work includes 12 volumes and each volume has 10-30 chapters. Each chapter has 50 to 300 stanzas.

Gannath Das translated the Odia Bhagabata into English. The English translation is Readings from Bhagabata

References

External links 
Oriya Bhagabata

Poets from Odisha
1550 deaths
Indian male poets
Odia-language poets
Odia people
Year of birth uncertain
16th-century Indian poets
1491 births
Odissi music composers
Vaishnava saints
16th-century Hindu religious leaders